Alejandro Sánchez Pimentel (born February 14, 1959) is a Dominican former professional baseball outfielder. He played during six Major League Baseball (MLB) seasons for the Philadelphia Phillies, San Francisco Giants, Detroit Tigers, Minnesota Twins, and Oakland Athletics. He played his first professional season in American baseball with Philadelphia's Rookie League Helena Phillies in 1978, and his last with the Oakland's Triple-A club, the Tacoma Tigers, in 1988.

External links

1959 births
Living people
Detroit Tigers players
Dominican Republic expatriate baseball players in Canada
Dominican Republic expatriate baseball players in the United States

Major League Baseball outfielders
Major League Baseball players from the Dominican Republic
Minnesota Twins players
Montreal Expos players
Nashville Sounds players
Oakland Athletics players
Pacific Coast League MVP award winners
Pacific Suns players
Philadelphia Phillies players
San Francisco Giants players
Acereros de Monclova players
Auburn Sunsets players
Central Oregon Phillies players
Dominican Republic expatriate baseball players in Mexico
Ganaderos de Tabasco players
Greenville Bluesmen players
Helena Phillies players
Industriales de Monterrey players
Oklahoma City 89ers players
Phoenix Giants players
Piratas de Campeche players
Portland Beavers players
Reading Phillies players
Rieleros de Aguascalientes players
Rojos del Águila de Veracruz players
Spartanburg Phillies players
Tacoma Tigers players
Toledo Mud Hens players
Tuneros de San Luis Potosí players